Canada competed at the 2015 Summer Universiade in Gwangju, South Korea.

Medals by sport

Medal by sports

Medalists

Athletics

Badminton

Baseball

Basketball

Canada qualified both a men's and a women's team.

Group B

|}

Quarterfinals

5th–8th place

Group A

|}

Quarterfinals

Semifinals

Gold-medal game

Diving

Fencing

Football

Canada qualified both a men's and a women's football team.

Men

Group A

9th–16th place

13th-place game

Women

Group D

Quarterfinals

1st–4th place

Bronze-medal match

Gymnastics

Canada qualified in both artistic gymnastics and rhythmic gymnastics.

Golf

Judo

Rowing

Shooting

Swimming

Taekwondo

Table tennis

Tennis

Volleyball

Canada qualified both a men's and a women's team.

Group D

|}

Quarterfinals

|}

5th–8th semifinals

|}

5th-place match

|}

Water-polo

Canada qualified a women's team.

Group A

Quarterfinals

Semifinals

Final

References

Nations at the 2015 Summer Universiade
2015 in Canadian sports
Canada at the Summer Universiade